Teatown Lake Reservation is a nonprofit nature preserve and environmental education center in Westchester County, New York, U.S., located in the towns of Ossining, Yorktown, Cortlandt, and New Castle. The reservation includes an  nature preserve and education center, visited annually by around 25,000 people.

Known by locals simply as "Teatown", the organization works to conserve biodiversity, teach ecology and promote nature-friendly living. Located in the Lower Hudson Valley's Hudson Highlands, Teatown Lake Reservation conserves open space, educates about the environment, sustaining the diversity of wildlife and plants.

History 
Teatown Lake Preservation began when in 1962 initially 245 acres were donated by a family to the Brooklyn Botanical Gardens, and were managed by staff from Teatown from 1963. From 1980, Teatown leased that property from the Gardens. In 2018, the Garden passed the property to Teatown.

Teatown provides conservation in the bioregion. Through sponsorship of the Hudson Hills and Highlands Environmental Leaders Learning Alliance (ELLA), Teatown provides assistance to civic leaders in crafting practical solutions to environmental issues and helps land owners and residents become more nature friendly.

In 2008, Teatown and the New York–New Jersey Trail Conference established a partnership on a new effort to provide assistance to local trail programs in Putnam and Westchester counties. Launched in July 2008, the "Hudson Hills and Highlands Community Trail Program" is part of the New York–New Jersey Trail Conference's larger effort to expand its reach east of the Hudson River from New York City to Columbia County. For nearly 100 years, New York–New Jersey Trail Conference volunteers have helped public agencies provide safe and responsible access to open space from New York City west to the Delaware Water Gap and north to the Catskills.

Environmental education 

Teatown teaches ecology to encourage responsible interaction with nature. About 25,000 people come each year to attend an education program, visit the Nature Center, hike its trails, and tour Wildflower Island, a  island sanctuary located within Teatown Lake that is home to over 230 native and endangered species of wildflowers.

Teatown's educators offer a variety of environmental education programs, including weekend family and adults only programs, multi-week children's series, school programs, school vacation camps, a summer camp, and special programs for Scouts and others organizations.

Over 10,000 participants annually attend one or more such educational programs, including nearly 6,000 school children and 700 summer campers. Annually, over 15,000 hikers traverse Teatown's  of trails that span fields, mixed forests, lakes, streams, swamps and farm land. Teatown volunteers participate in the "Great Backyard Bird Count" sponsored by the Audubon Society each winter.

Teatown's Nature Center is a source of wildlife knowledge and home to a variety of amphibians, birds of prey, mammals and reptiles. The Nature Center also houses a store with books and small gifts. The Center often hosts gallery shows of art by area painters and photographers related to environmental themes.

Land stewardship 

Teatown Lake Reservation serves as a  oasis for many of the plants and animals that inhabit the Hudson Hills and Highlands. Teatown expanded its Environmental Stewardship Program to manage the flora and fauna living in the preserve for the benefit of nature conservation and regional ecological health.

Annual festivals 
Teatown conducts two annual celebrations that are open to the public: the Hudson River EagleFest and the Plant Sale. The EagleFest takes place in February each year, when winter conditions make eagles easier to spot as they search for prey on the Hudson River. The EagleFest offers visitors live raptor demonstrations in tents at Westchester County's Croton Point Park.

The annual Nature Friendly Plant Sale is held in the tradition of the Cliffdale Farm legacy of Teatown and is a source for local hardy and diverse garden plants. The plant sale takes place each spring.

References

Further reading 
 Walkable Westchester, Jane and Walt Daniels, 2009, New York New Jersey Trail Conference
 60 Hikes Within 60 Miles: New York City, 2nd ed., Christopher and Catherine Brooks, 2008, Menasha Ridge Press
 The Hudson Valley and Catskill Mountains: An Explorer’s Guide, Fifth Edition, Joanne Michaels, 2004, The Countryman Press, pages 381-2, 400
 Teatown Lake Reservation: Images of America, Lincoln Diamant, 2002, Arcadia Publishing
 50 Hikes in the Lower Hudson Valley, Sheila Greenland and H. Neil Zimmerman, 2002, Back County Guides, pages 40–44
 The Best of the Hudson Valley and Catskill Mountains: An Explorer’s Guide, Fifth Edition, Joanne Michaels and Mary-Margaret Barile, 2001, The Countryman Press, page 269
 New York State Handbook, Second Edition, Christiane Bird, 2000, Moon Travel Handbooks, page 328

External links 

 
 Teatown Lake Reservation hudsonrivervalley.com
 Teatown Thoughts (director's blog)
 Teatown Lake Reservation Are We There Yet?
 Teatown Photo Gallery by Marc Baumser

Nature reserves in New York (state)
Nature centers in New York (state)
Protected areas of Westchester County, New York